The Cedar Mountain Range is a short 20 mi (32 km) long, mountain range in southwest Luna County, New Mexico, USA, just north of the Mexico–United States border with Chihuahua.

The range lies in the northwest Chihuahuan Desert and the extreme northwest end of the range lies in southeast Grant County. It is here that the Continental Divide of the Americas crosses the range, turns northwest, then west, and south at the north perimeter of the north–south Playas Valley. The continental divide continues south into Mexico on the western perimeter of the Playas Valley, through three mountain ranges, the Pyramid, Animas, and San Luis Mountains (New Mexico).

Description
The Cedar Mountain Range is a northwest by southeast trending range, and longer, than wide. The northwest end contains Deer Mountain, with an excursion of the continental divide around the wash that drains the northeast. The water divide continues through Deer Mountain and heads northwest on a circuitous route around the northern perimeter and water divide of the north Playas Valley.

Three other larger peaks dot the range: the center contains Hat Top Mountain,  at north-center.

Continental Divide
The Continental Divide starts to leave the forested mountain regions as it goes southwest from Silver City. It passes from the southern Little Burro Mountains, crosses the Big Burro's, then on a circuitous route after skirting the northeast of the Cedar Mountain Range, it passes across the water divide of the north Playas Valley, west of Hachita. It finally enters a series of north–south ranges, including the Animas Mountains, and travels south into northwest Chihuahua, Mexico.

See also
List of peaks named Baldy, Old Baldy, (coordinates)

References

External links
Range Highpoint
Flying W Mountain, mountainzone, (coordinates)

New Mexico highpoints
New Mexico Ranges, UTM table

Cedar Mountain Range
Cedar Mountain Range, mountainzone.com

Mountain ranges of New Mexico
Landforms of Luna County, New Mexico
Mountain ranges of Grant County, New Mexico
Great Divide of North America